Ignacio Guerrico (born 9 July 1998) is an Argentine professional footballer who plays for Slovenian PrvaLiga club Maribor. Primarily a left-back, he can also play as a left midfielder.

Guerrico also has Italian citizenship.

Career
Guerrico began his career with Asociación Deportiva Infantil Platense (ADIP), where he made one appearance in Torneo Federal B, Argentina's fourth tier. In 2018, Guerrico moved across to Primera C Metropolitana's Villa San Carlos. They won promotion via the play-offs at the end of 2018–19, as he scored once (against Excursionistas in the final's first leg) across sixteen appearances. He made his Primera B Metropolitana debut on 26 August 2019 versus San Miguel, which preceded a further twenty-four appearances. With his contract set to expire on 31 January 2021, Guerrico was linked with moves to Europe and New Zealand. Overall, Guerrico made 53 appearances for Villa San Carlos in all competitions.

On 19 January 2021, Villa San Carlos announced that Guerrico had agreed a move to Slovenia with PrvaLiga outfit Maribor. He was officially revealed two days later, signing a two-year contract with the club.

Career statistics

References

External links

1998 births
Living people
Footballers from La Plata
Argentine footballers
Association football fullbacks
Association football midfielders
Argentine expatriate footballers
Expatriate footballers in Slovenia
Argentine expatriate sportspeople in Slovenia
Primera C Metropolitana players
Primera B Metropolitana players
Slovenian PrvaLiga players
Club Atlético Villa San Carlos footballers
NK Maribor players
NK Tabor Sežana players